Dame Lucy Morgan Theis DBE KC (born 6 November 1960), styled The Hon. Mrs. Justice Theis, is a judge of the High Court of England and Wales.

She was educated at the University of Birmingham (LLB, 1981). She was called to the Bar by Gray's Inn in 1982 and took Silk in 2003. She was appointed a Recorder in 2000 and was approved to sit as a deputy High Court Judge.

Between 2005 and 2010 she was the head of Field Court Chambers in London and was Chair of the Family Law Bar Association in 2008 until 2009. Theis was  appointed to be a High Court Judge in 2010 and in 2011 she was appointed a Family Division Liaison Judge on the South Eastern Circuit, in this role There had responsibility for Kent, Surrey and Sussex and later for London and Thames Valley.

Since 2018 she has chaired the Family Procedure Rules Committee and the Family Justice Council and is the lead judge in relation to applications under the Human Fertilisation and Embryology Act 2008.

Mrs Justice Theis was appointed as the Senior Family Liaison Judge for a four-year period from October 2018.

Notable cases 

In August 2022, Theis heard one of the cases regarding Archie Battersbee and the withdrawal of his life support.

References

1960 births
Living people
Alumni of the University of Birmingham
Members of Gray's Inn
Family Division judges
British women judges
Dames Commander of the Order of the British Empire